Robert Young Thomas Jr. (July 13, 1855 – September 3, 1925) was a U.S. Representative from Kentucky.

Born near Russellville, Kentucky, Thomas attended the common schools, and was graduated from Bethel College, Russellville, Kentucky, in 1878.
He studied law.
He was admitted to the bar in 1881 and commenced practice in Central City, Kentucky.
He also engaged in journalism.
He served as member of the State house of representatives in 1886 and 1887.

Thomas was elected Commonwealth attorney for the seventh judicial district of Kentucky in 1903 for a term of six years.

Thomas was elected as a Democrat to the Sixty-first and to the eight succeeding Congresses and served from March 4, 1909, until his death at Red Boiling Springs, Tennessee, September 3, 1925. During his time in Congress he introduced a bill in 1915 and 1920 to allow Civil War veterans of Kentucky that served over 90 days in the Kentucky State Militia to receive pensions. This bill was denied.
He was interred in Evergreen Cemetery, Greenville, Kentucky.

See also
List of United States Congress members who died in office (1900–49)

References

1859 births
1925 deaths
Bethel College (Kentucky) alumni
Kentucky lawyers
Democratic Party members of the Kentucky House of Representatives
People from Russellville, Kentucky
Democratic Party members of the United States House of Representatives from Kentucky
People from Central City, Kentucky
19th-century American lawyers